Krzysztof Hotowski (born 25 November 1981 in Zgierz, Poland) is a Polish rugby union player who plays as a wing or centre.

References

External links 

Polish rugby union players
1981 births
Living people
People from Zgierz
Rugby union centres